Neil Waka is a New Zealand broadcaster and journalist. He has been in broadcasting for 25 years, beginning in radio as a news and current affairs journalist before moving into Television. Waka helped establish and was the first presenter in New Zealand to present the weekday 4:30 pm news bulletins on ONE News for TVNZ, for almost two years from 2007.

Neil Waka is a New Zealand broadcast journalists (radio and television) and one of the first of Maori ethnicity to break into mainstream television as a news anchor for more than two decades.

He is also one of only a handful of news anchors who has held a full-time news presenting role at the two largest mainstream networks, TV3 and TVNZ.

When he departed television, he took on a corporate role with global organisation General Motors Holden New Zealand for five years before moving to Coca-Cola Amatil New Zealand as Head of Corporate Affairs NZ & Fiji.

After nine years out of the media spotlight, Neil was again back on New Zealand television screens as a guest sports news presenter for Newshub's AM Show prior to Christmas 2019.

See also
 List of New Zealand television personalities

References

External links
 Neil Waka at TVNZ

Living people
New Zealand journalists
New Zealand television newsreaders and news presenters
Year of birth missing (living people)
People from Rotorua
New Zealand Māori broadcasters